Bicton is a civil parish and a former manor in the East Devon district of Devon, England, near the town of Budleigh Salterton. The parish is surrounded, clockwise from the north, by the parishes of Colaton Raleigh, Otterton, East Budleigh and Woodbury. According to the 2001 census it had a population of 280. Much of the parish consists of Bicton Park, the historic home of the Rolle family, with Bicton Common, adjacent to Woodbury Common, in the west. The parish includes the village of Yettington on its southern border.

History

Bicton appears in the Domesday Book of 1086 as Bechetone, held by William Porter, probably by the service of guarding the gate at Exeter Castle and the prison there. The manor passed through several families until Sir Thomas Denys (1559–1613) left two daughters as co-heiresses. The eldest was Anne Denys, who by her marriage to Sir Henry Rolle (d.1616) of Stevenstone, brought Bicton to the Rolle family.

The gardens at Bicton were begun in around 1735, supposedly to a design by André Le Nôtre, but most of the work was undertaken by John Rolle, 1st Baron Rolle in the early 19th century. This included the digging of the lake in 1812 by French prisoners of war, planting the arboretum in 1830 and the noted araucaria avenue in 1842. Other features include the orangery (1806), the "bulbous" palm house (c. 1825), and the castellated octagonal China Tower of 1839.

John Rolle died, childless, aged 86 in 1842. However, after his marriage to his second wife, Louisa Trefusis, he decided to appoint as his heir her nephew, the six-year-old Mark George Kerr Trefusis (the younger brother of the 20th Baron Clinton) requiring him to change his name to Rolle, which he did. However, when Mark Rolle died in 1907 he left no male heir so the Rolle inheritance passed to his nephew, Charles Hepburn-Stuart-Forbes-Trefusis, 21st Baron Clinton (1863–1957).

The gardens at Bicton were renovated by the baron in the 1950s and opened to the public in 1963. The 22nd Baron gave the botanical gardens to a charitable trust in 1986, which sold them in 1998 to Simon and Valerie Lister who turned their  into a commercial visitor attraction named Bicton Park Botanical Gardens – see below. The remainder of the land comprising the former manor of Bicton is still owned by Baron Clinton under the management of Clinton Devon Estates. The equestrian venue known as Bicton Arena is also part of the estate.

Church 
In 1850, Lady Louisa Rolle commemorated her late husband by building a new church on the estate close to the old one, which was partly demolished and the chancel reworked by Augustus Pugin as a mausoleum to the Rolle family. The mausoleum, which is not open to the public, contains Minton floor tiles, a vaulted ceiling, east and west decorated windows by Pugin, and a Rolle monument on the north wall designed by George Myers. It also contains the baroque marble tomb of Denys Rolle (died 1638) and his wife and son, which was described by W. G. Hoskins as "magnificent". Some fifty years before its demolition, the topographer John Swete made a watercolour painting of the old church, and wrote of its picturesque setting in his journal in 1795.

The church of 1850 was designed by the Exeter-based architect, John Hayward: Hoskins simply called it "dull", though it was later described as an early example in Devon of the ideals of the Cambridge Camden Society.

Landmarks

Bicton Obelisk on the edge of the park was built in 1747 by Henry Rolle, 1st Baron Rolle (1708–1750) as a visual attraction for the gardens.

Rolle also built the four-sided pillar in the centre of the four-cross-ways between Bicton and Otterton in 1743. As well as serving as a signpost for the various places to which the four roads lead, it incorporates biblical inscriptions, such as "Her ways are ways of pleasantness", etc.

Bicton Park Botanical Gardens
Bicton Park Botanical Gardens is a tourist attraction on the southern part of the former Bicton estate. The landscaped park includes historic glasshouses, a countryside museum, the Bicton Woodland Railway train ride, nature trail, maze, mini golf, indoor and outdoor children's play complexes, restaurant and shop. The gardens, which originated in c.1730 are Grade I listed.

The four glasshouses at Bicton Gardens were designed to re-create the natural environment of plants from different continents. The Palm House was built in the 1820s to a curvilinear design, using 18,000 small glass panes in thin iron glazing bars. The Tropical House is the home of the Bicton orchid (Lemboglossum bictoniense), named after the Park where it first bloomed in 1836. The Arid House features cacti and other succulents growing in a naturalistic desert landscape.

Notes

References

External links

 Bicton Park Botanical Gardens
Bicton Arena
Bicton College

Villages in Devon
Civil parishes in Devon